The Mesilla Park Elementary School, in Las Cruces, New Mexico, was listed on the National Register of Historic Places in 2015.

The New Mexico Historic Preservation Commission stated that "The school is notable for its brick construction and its numerous
additions built between 1916-1963 as the agricultural valley saw rapid growth because of its pecan orchards and other crops, and the growth of New Mexico State University Mesilla Park Elementary began as a one-room adobe school house in 1901."

It also is a contributing building in the 2016-listed Mesilla Park Historic District.

It is now the Frank O'Brien Papen Community Center.

It was built, beginning in 1907, in the new Bowman Addition development.

"The Mesilla Park Elementary School is a large, sprawling, one-story school building (photo 32).
Designed by Henry Trost and built in 1907, the school is a Spanish Mission Revival-style
building with decorative pediment above the main entrance. The brick building was covered
with a hipped roof and included four classrooms. As the student population increased, a series of
additions were added beginning in 1916 with two additions on the north and south ends to
accommodate four additional classrooms and an auditorium on the rear (west) side of the
building. In 1934, classroom additions were again added to the north and south ends of the
school. In 1943, a new, larger auditorium, which seats 400 students, was built on the west end of
the 1934 auditorium. Lastly, in 1963, a cafeteria was built on the southwest side of the roughly
T-shaped building."

See also
La Mesilla, New Mexico
La Mesilla Historic District

References

External links

Schools in New Mexico
National Register of Historic Places in Doña Ana County, New Mexico
Mission Revival architecture in New Mexico